Ust-Veslyana is a rural locality (a settlement) in Gaynskoye Rural Settlement, Gaynsky District, Perm Krai, Russia. The population was 183 as of 2010. There are 6 streets.

Geography 
Ust-Veslyana is located 24 km west of Gayny (the district's administrative centre) by road. Ust-Chukurya is the nearest rural locality.

References 

Rural localities in Gaynsky District